Come On may refer to:

Music
 Come On (EP), by Elf Power, 1999
 "Come On" (Billy Lawrence song), 1997
 "Come On" (Christine Anu song), 1995
 "Come On" (Chuck Berry song), 1961; covered by the Rolling Stones, 1963
 "Come On" (CNBLUE song), 2012
 "Come On" (Earl King song), 1960
 "Come On" (The Jesus and Mary Chain song), 1994
 "Come On" (Kish Mauve song), 2009; covered by Will Young, 2011
 "Come On" (The New Power Generation song), 1998
 "Come On" (Rihanna song), 2011; usually known as "S&M"
 "Come On", a song by Barry White from The Icon Is Love, 1994
 "Come On", a song by Chelsea from Alternative Hits, 1980
 "Come On", a song by City Girls and Saweetie from the compilation Control the Streets, Volume 2, 2019
 "Come On", a song by Green River Ordinance from Out of My Hands, 2009
 "Come On", a song by Hell on Wheels, 2006
 "Come On!", a song by the Hives from Lex Hives, 2012
 "Come On", a song by the  Hours from See the Light, 2009
 "Come On", a song by Jhené Aiko from Chilombo, 2020
 "Come On", a song by Jimmy Somerville from Home Again, 2004
 "Come On", a song by Krokus from Metal Rendez-vous, 1980
 "Come On", a song by Living Colour from Shade, 2017
 "Come On", a song by Los Saicos, 1965
 "Come On", a song by Mushroomhead from Beautiful Stories for Ugly Children, 2010
 "Come On", a song by Tommy Roe, 1964
 "Come On", a song by the Verve from Urban Hymns, 1997
 "Come On", a song by Wham! from Fantastic, 1983
 "Come On", a song by White Lies from Friends, 2016
 "Come On/Let's Go", a song by Paul Weller from As Is Now, 2005
 "Come On, Let's Go", a song by Ritchie Valens from the self-titled album, 1959
 "Come On and Love Me", a song by Lenny Kravitz from Are You Gonna Go My Way, 1993

Other uses
 "Come On" (How I Met Your Mother), a television episode
The Come On, a 1956 American film starring Anne Baxter
 Come On, a video game for the Vii console

See also
 Come On Come On (disambiguation)
 C'mon (disambiguation)
 Common (disambiguation)